135 (one hundred [and] thirty-five) is the natural number following 134 and preceding 136.

In mathematics

Using its own digits, 135 in base-10 can be expressed in operations as the sum of consecutive powers of its digits, and as a sum-product number:

135 is the number of degrees in the internal angle of a regular eight-sided octagon. Also:
the Euler totient of 135 is 72: the degrees of a central angle in a regular pentagon. 
the arithmetic mean of the divisors of 135 is 30: the degrees in a central angle of a regular dodecagon.

While the central angle of a regular octagon is 135 ÷ 3 = 45 degrees, 4.5 is the harmonic mean of all eight divisors of 135. 

The aliquot sum of 135 is 105, which is the 14th triangular number, or equivalently the sum of the first fourteen non-zero positive integers.

There are 135 total Krotenheerdt k-uniform tilings for k < 8, with no other such tilings for higher k.

There are a total of 135 primes between 1,000 and 2,000.

In other fields
 The year AD 135 or 135 BC.
 135 AH is a year in the Islamic calendar that corresponds to 752–753 CE.
 135 Hertha is a large main belt asteroid which orbits among the Nysa asteroid family.
 135 film, the cartridge version of 35mm photographic film, used widely in still photography.
 The Canon FD 135 mm lens.
 In astrology, when two planets are 135 degrees apart, they are in an astrological aspect called a sesquiquadrate. The aspect was first used by Johannes Kepler.
 Sonnet 135 by William Shakespeare.
 Municipal District of Peace No. 135, a municipal district in northwest Alberta, Canada.
 Enoch Cree Nation 135 Indian reserve in Alberta, Canada is home to the Enoch Cree Nation.
 The EZ 135 Drive removable hard disk drive introduced by SyQuest Technology in 1995.
 OC-135B Open Skies United States Air Force observation aircraft flies unarmed observation flights over nations of the Treaty on Open Skies.

See also 

 List of highways numbered 135
 United Nations Security Council Resolution 135
 United States Supreme Court cases, Volume 135

References 

Integers